Adam White (born 9 January 1976) is an Australian sportsman and filmmaker.

Australian rules football career
White played for Carlton in the Australian Football League from 1997 to 2001.

White is best remembered for his accidental collision with an umpire during a match, a collision that resulted in White knocking himself out.

Film career
After retiring from professional football due to injury (unrelated to the umpire incident), White launched a new career as an independent filmmaker.

His first independently produced short film was A Black and White World, which played at a number of festivals.

White followed with Toucan 2008, for which he received funding support from Film Australia.

Filmography

Director

 A Black and White World (short) – 2005
 Toucan (short) – 2007
 Attack (short) – 2011
 Kane & Disabled (TV series, 10 episodes) – 2012

Editor

 A Black and White World (short) – 2005
 Trampoline (short) – 2008
 Lowdown (TV series, 5 episodes) – 2010
 Attack (short) – 2011
 The Match Committee (TV series, 26 episodes) – 2011
 Santo, Sam and Ed's Sports Fever! (TV series, all 10 episodes) – 2012
 Kane & Disabled (TV series, 10 episodes) – 2012
 Scare Campaign - 2016

References

External links

Australian rules footballers from Victoria (Australia)
1976 births
Australian filmmakers
Carlton Football Club players
Living people